Spondee is a metrical foot consisting of two stressed syllables.

Spondee may also refer to:
 "Spondee" (song), an electronica song composed by Matmos
 Libation, ritual offering of wine poured out to the gods before drinking